Nadekan or Nadakan, also rendered as Nadehkan or Nadeh Kan, may refer to:
 Nadekan-e Jami
 Nadekan-e Gurmi
 Nadekan-e Shafi Mohammad
 Nadekan-e Shahdad